Tanki may refer to:

 Tanki Online, an MMO game launched by AlternativaPlatform
 Tanki X, a discontinued browser game by AlternativaPlatform
 Tanki Manang, a village development committee in Nepal